Tom van de Looi (born 2 July 1999) is a Dutch professional footballer who plays as a midfielder for  club Brescia. His father is football manager and former footballer Erwin van de Looi.

Club career
On 14 August 2019 he joined NEC on loan for the 2019–20 season.

Brescia
In September 2020, he joined Serie B club Brescia on a permanent deal from Eredivisie club Groningen.

Career statistics

Club

References

External links
 
 

1999 births
Footballers from Breda
Living people
Dutch footballers
Association football midfielders
Netherlands youth international footballers
FC Groningen players
NEC Nijmegen players
Brescia Calcio players
Eredivisie players
Eerste Divisie players
Derde Divisie players
Dutch expatriate footballers
Expatriate footballers in Italy